Page 3 was a British newspaper convention of publishing a large image of topless women in several tabloid newspapers.

Page 3 may also refer to:
 Page 3 culture, a culture related to page 3 of Indian tabloids, which feature gossip about high society
 Page 3 (film), a Bollywood film by Madhur Bhandarkar